In Greek mythology, Europa is the name of:

 Europa (consort of Zeus)
 one of the Oceanids, the daughters of the Titan Oceanus
 daughter of the earth giant Tityas and mother of Poseidon's son Euphemus the Argonaut